Hong Kong participated in the 2006 Asian Games held in Doha, Qatar with a total of 281 athletes (195 men, 86 women) in 30 different sports.

Medals by sport

Medalists

Gold 
 Badminton: women's singles: Wang Chen
 Bodybuilding: men's -75 kg: Chan Yun To
 Cycling: men's road race: Wong Kam Po
 Cycling: men's points race: Cheung King Wai
 Sailing: men's mistral light: Chan King Yin
 Table tennis: men's doubles: Ko Lai Chak / Li Ching

Silver 
 Badminton: women's singles: Yip Pui Yin
 Cue sports: men's snooker doubles: Marco Fu Ka Chun / Chan Wai Ki
 Cue sports: men's snooker team: Fung Kwok Wai / Marco Fu Ka Chun / Chan Wai Ki
 Rowing: women's lightweight single sculls: Lee Ka Man
 Sailing: men's mistral heavy: Ho Chi Ho
 Sailing: women's mistral: Chan Wai Kei
 Squash: women's singles: Chiu Wing Yin
 Table tennis: women's singles: Tie Ya Na
 Table tennis: women's doubles: Tie Ya Na / Zhang Rui
 Triathlon: men's competition: Chi Wo Daniel Lee
 Wushu: men's taijiquan: Hei Zhi Hong
 Wushu: women's nanquan: Angie Tsang

Bronze 
 Fencing: men's foil team: Cheung Kai Tung / Lau Kwok Kin / Kwoon Yat Kevin Ngan / Wong Kam Kau
 Fencing: women's épée team: Yuk Han Bjork Cheng / Cheung Yi Nei / Sabrina Lui / Yeung Chui Ling
 Fencing: women's sabre individual: Chow Tsz Ki
 Fencing: women's sabre team: Au Yeung Wai Sum / Chow Tsz Ki / Pau Ming Wai Akina / Tsui Wan Yi
 Karate: women's kumite -60 kg: Chan Ma Kan
 Squash: women's singles: Mak Pui Hin
 Swimming: women's 4 × 100 m free relay: Hannah Wilson / Tsai Hiu Wai / Lee Leong Kwai / Sze Hang Yu
 Table tennis: men's singles: Li Ching
 Table tennis: men's team: Cheung Yuk / Ko Lai Chak / Li Ching / Leung Chu Yan / Tse Ka Chun
 Weightlifting: women's -53 kg: Yu Wi Li

Nations at the 2006 Asian Games
2006
Asian Games